John Hartwell Hillman Sr. (1841–1911) was an American businessman and the founder of the Hillman Coal and Coke Company.

Early life
He was born in Kentucky in 1841, the eldest son of Daniel C. Hillman (1807–1885) and his first wife, Ann Jones Marable.

Career
He started his career in Nashville, Tennessee, before moving to Pittsburgh in the mid-1880s, where he "became one of the financial and industrial leaders".

He established the Hillman Coal and Coke Company, and J. H. Hillman & Sons, which was eventually run by his three sons. Hillman Coal and Coke Company later became Pittsburgh Coke & Chemical, and it is now Calgon Carbon.

Personal life
He married Sallie Murfree Frazer, and they had three sons:

John Hartwell Hillman Jr. (1880–1959)
Ernest Hillman (1883–1969), retired from Hillman Coal and Coke Company in 1945, then active in politics
James Frazier Hillman (1888–1972)

References

1841 births
1911 deaths
Businesspeople from Kentucky
19th-century American businesspeople